Dorothy Sebastian (born Stella Dorothy Sabiston; April 26, 1903 – April 8, 1957) was an American film and stage actress.

Early years
Sebastian was born and raised in Birmingham, Alabama, the daughter of Lycurgus (Lawrence) Robert and Stella Armstrong Sabiston. After leaving Alabama and starting a career on the stage, she changed the spelling of her name to Sebastian.

In her youth, she aspired to be a dancer and a film actress. Her family frowned on both ambitions, however, so she fled to New York at the age of 15. Upon her arrival in New York City, Sebastian's southern drawl was thick enough to "cut with a knife". She followed around theatrical agents before returning at night to a $12-a-month room, after being consistently rejected.

Career 
Before appearing in films, Sebastian performed onstage in the musical revue, George White's Scandals. Her first contact in Hollywood was Robert Kane, who gave her a film test at United Studios. She co-starred with Joan Crawford and Anita Page in a popular series of MGM romantic dramas, including Our Dancing Daughters (1928) and Our Blushing Brides (1930). Sebastian appeared in 1929's Spite Marriage, where she was cast opposite the then-married Buster Keaton, with whom she began an affair.

By the mid-1930s, Sebastian was semi-retired from acting after marrying Hopalong Cassidy star William Boyd. After their 1936 divorce, she returned to acting appearing in mostly bit parts. Her last onscreen appearance was in the 1948 film The Miracle of the Bells.

Songwriting
Sebastian co-wrote the ballad "The Leaves Mustn't Fall" with Jack Kenney. Moon Mullican recorded it in 1950 and 1958, and it has become a bluegrass standard.

Personal life

While still in Birmingham, she married her high-school sweetheart, Allen Stafford, on November 9, 1920. The marriage ended four years later just before she moved to New York.

Sebastian married actor William Boyd in December 1930 in Las Vegas, Nevada. They began a relationship after meeting on the set of His First Command in 1929. They divorced in 1936.

In 1947, Sebastian married Miami Beach businessman Harold Shapiro to whom she remained married until her death.

Legal issues
On November 7, 1938, Sebastian was found guilty of drunk driving in a Beverly Hills, California Justice Court. The night she was arrested, she had been dining at Buster Keaton's home with her nephew. She was given a 30-day suspended jail sentence and paid a fine of $75.

In 1940, Sebastian was denied an award of $10,000 from a San Diego court. She had appeared at a Red Cross benefit in San Francisco in 1937, and failed to pay her hotel bill. She contended the promoter for the event should have paid the bill. An employee of the Plaza Hotel took out the suit, charging "defrauding an innkeeper." The State Supreme Court of California reversed the lower court's decision, which had awarded her the money on grounds of malicious prosecution.

Death and legacy
On April 8, 1957, Sebastian died of cancer at the Motion Picture & Television Country House and Hospital in Woodland Hills, California. She was several weeks shy of her 54th birthday. She is buried at Holy Cross Cemetery, Culver City, California.

For her contribution to the motion picture industry, Sebastian has a star on the Hollywood Walk of Fame at 6655 Hollywood Boulevard. It was dedicated on February 8, 1960.

Filmography

Notes

References

Los Angeles Times, "Alabama Steps To Top", August 10, 1930, Page B16.
Oakland Tribune, "Kin of Actress Burns To Death", May 14, 1938, Page 1.

External links

DorothySebastian.com
Dorothy Sebastian at Virtual History

20th-century American actresses
American film actresses
American silent film actresses
American stage actresses
Burials at Holy Cross Cemetery, Culver City
Deaths from cancer in California
Actresses from Birmingham, Alabama
1903 births
1957 deaths